Stark Hall  is an American residence hall at Texas Woman's University, and was the tallest building in Denton, Texas until the completion of the adjacent Guinn Hall Traditionally single-sex, in fall 2016, it became co-educational and houses first year and sophomore students only.

References 

Texas Woman's University
Buildings and structures in Denton, Texas
Residential skyscrapers in Texas